Calci is a comune (municipality) in the Province of Pisa in the Italian region Tuscany, located about  west of Florence and about  east of Pisa.

Government
 Frazioni 
The main settlement is the municipal seat of La Pieve; the rest of the population is distributed between the other hamlets – frazioni – of Castelmaggiore, Crespignano, Gabella, Il Colle-Villa, La Corte-San Piero, Pontegrande-Sant'Andrea, Montemagno, Rezzano-Nicosia and Tre Colli.

Main sights 
Its main attraction is Pisa Charterhouse, also known as Calci Charterhouse (Certosa di Pisa or di Calci), which houses a natural history museum of the University of Pisa.

External links

 Official website
 Tourism in Calci

Cities and towns in Tuscany